William Wiebe (born 30 October 1963 in Fort Vermilion) is a Canadian Paralympic athlete. He competed in the 1984 and 1988 Summer Paralympics. In the 1988 Paralympics, he won a silver medal in the men's 100 metres.

References

Athletes (track and field) at the 1984 Summer Paralympics
Athletes (track and field) at the 1988 Summer Paralympics
Paralympic silver medalists for Canada
1963 births
Living people
Medalists at the 1988 Summer Paralympics
Paralympic medalists in athletics (track and field)
Paralympic track and field athletes of Canada
Paralympic sprinters
Sprinters with limb difference